Gone is a 2012 American thriller film written by Allison Burnett, directed by Heitor Dhalia, and starring Amanda Seyfried. The film earned negative reviews from critics and was a box office disappointment.

Plot
Jillian "Jill" Conway lives in Portland, Oregon with her sister, Molly. One year earlier, Jill was kidnapped by a brutal serial killer who held her captive in a deep vertical hole containing the remains of his other victims somewhere in Portland's 5,100-acre Forest Park. Jill used one of the bones to stab her abductor when he arrived in the hole to kill her, and escaped using his rope ladder. When the Portland police were unable to find the hole and discovered that Jill had been committed to a psychiatric institution after her parents' death, they believed the abduction only happened in Jill's head and sent her back to a psychiatric facility.

Jill now works as a waitress in a local diner on the graveyard shift. She and her friend, Sharon Ames, are generously tipped by a regular customer. Returning home one day after work, Jill discovers Molly is missing and not even her sister's boyfriend, Billy, knows her whereabouts. Knowing her sister wouldn't run off since she had an exam the next day, Jill is then convinced the serial killer who took her has now taken Molly. However, Police Lt. Ray Bozeman, Sergeant Powers, and Detective Erica Lonsdale dismiss her claims, believing that it's all in Jill's head. Only the department's newest Homicide detective, Peter Hood, believes Jill, giving her his card in case she needs any help about the case.

Jill interrogates her neighbors and learns that a van with a locksmith company's name was parked in front of her house in the middle of the night. She talks to the company's owner, Henry Massey, and his son, Nick. When Nick denies any knowledge, Jill breaks into the van, where she finds a receipt from a hardware store for items the killer would use. She holds Nick at gunpoint and forces him to reveal that he allowed a stranger named "Digger" to rent the van during the night.

Jill goes to the hardware store and learns "Digger"'s real name, Jim LaPointe, and address. She breaks into LaPointe's room and finds duct tape, pet food like that which she was given by her kidnapper, and matches from the diner where she works. Meanwhile, Nick reports Jill's gun-waving to the police, who begin to search for her, as Jill's time in a psychiatric institution means she cannot legally possess a firearm.

Jill visits Sharon and learns that LaPointe is the generous tipper from the diner. Sharon gives her his phone number and lets Jill use her car. Jill leaves and calls LaPointe, who gives her directions to a spot in Forest Park. There, she locates a small campsite and finds pictures of LaPointe's prior victims. At the same time, Molly breaks out of her restraints and escapes, only to discover she has been concealed under her house all along. Powers and Lonsdale are shocked when they hear Molly's story, finally believing Jill. They also learn Jill is to meet the kidnapper, but they don't know where that is to happen.

Jill finds the hole where LaPointe held her captive. LaPointe ambushes Jill and pulls her into the hole, intending to kill her with the same piece of bone that she stabbed him with in her initial escape. However, Jill shoots him and starts climbing up the rope ladder. When LaPointe grabs her and attempts to pull her back down, Jill desperately kicks LaPointe to break his hold and shoots him again. She then manages to climb out and extract the rope ladder, trapping LaPointe in the hole. After shooting LaPointe a third time in the leg so that he cannot stand, Jill demands he tell her where Molly is, on a promise of not shooting him again. LaPointe admits that Molly was under their house the whole time, and he only used her to lure Jill into the trap. Jill pours a can of kerosene into the hole. As LaPointe begs for his life, Jill simply responds, "I lied." She then drops a lantern in the hole, burning LaPointe to death.

Jill disposes of the revolver and returns home, finding Molly terrified but unharmed with Powers, Lonsdale, and Hood. As the sisters reunite, Jill whispers to Molly that LaPointe is dead. When Powers asks about the man Jill was to meet, she sarcastically tells the police, "It was all in my head."

Sometime later, Bozeman receives an anonymous package containing pictures LaPointe had taken of each of his victims bound and gagged, including Jill herself, and a map that indicates the spot in Forest Park where the police can find the hole. Realizing how wrong he was about Jill, Bozeman calls Powers into his office to investigate the new leads.

Cast
 Amanda Seyfried as Jillian "Jill" Conway
 Wes Bentley as Det. Peter Hood
 Sebastian Stan as Billy 
 Daniel Sunjata as Sgt. Powers
 Jennifer Carpenter as Sharon Ames 
 Nick Searcy as M. Miller
 Socratis Otto as Jim LaPointe (Digger)
 Emily Wickersham as Molly Conway
 Joel David Moore as Nick Massey
 Katherine Moennig as Det. Erica Lonsdale
 Michael Paré as Lt. Ray Bozeman
 Ted Rooney as Henry Massey
 Amy Lawhorn as Tanya Muslin
 Susan Hess as Dr. Mira Anders
 Jeanine Jackson as Mrs. Cermak
 Hunter Parrish as Trey
 Jordan Fry as Jock

Production
In February 2011, it was announced Amanda Seyfried had been selected to topline the thriller Gone directed by Heitor Dhalia from a script penned by Allison Burnett

Reception

Critical reception
The rated PG-13 film was not screened for critics and was panned. Gone currently holds a 12% rating on Rotten Tomatoes based on 69 reviews from critics, with an average score of 3.49/10. On Metacritic, which uses an average of critics' reviews, Gone has a 36/100 rating, indicating "generally unfavorable" reviews.

Writing in DVDTalk, critic Adam Tyner described the film as "just another room temperature thriller lacking much in the way of, y'know, thrills. It's just ticking off check boxes," and noted that "the direction is as aggressively anonymous as the writing." A review in Variety described the film as "a low-pulse thriller that evaporates from memory with the last credit." Critic R. Kurt Oselund wrote in Slant that "the script by Allison Burnett [...] is a layer cake of easy plot propellers, iced with rib-tickling garbage like a wooded crime scene," and that "Seyfried does indeed look a touch silly running from point to belabored point with her goldilocks a-flowing [but she is] as unerring as anyone could hope for from someone tasked to spit out lines like, 'I’ll sleep when he’s dead!'"

Box office
Gone grossed a domestic amount of $11,682,205 and $6,417,984 internationally for a worldwide total of $18,100,189.

References

External links
 
 
 
 
 
 

2012 films
2010s mystery thriller films
American mystery thriller films
2010s English-language films
Fictional portrayals of the Portland Police Bureau
Films directed by Heitor Dhalia
Films about kidnapping
Films about sisters
Films set in Portland, Oregon
Films shot in Portland, Oregon
Lakeshore Entertainment films
Summit Entertainment films
Lionsgate films
Sidney Kimmel Entertainment films
Films produced by Sidney Kimmel
Films produced by Gary Lucchesi
Films scored by David Buckley
2010s American films